, also known as , is a Japanese voice actress from Tokyo, Japan.

Filmography

Anime
Jigoku Sensei Nūbē (1996), Tomoko
Hell Girl (2005), Yōko
Lamune (2005), Hikari Nakazato
Higurashi When They Cry (2006–2007), Receptionist, Nurse
Underbar Summer (2006), Wakana Shimazu
Kotetsushin Jeeg (2007), TV Announcer
Sisters of Wellber (2008), Iruga
Chaos;Head (2008), Orgel Seira
Koihime Musō (2008–2010), Kaku (Ei)
Yozakura Quartet (2008), Schoolgirl
We Without Wings (2011), Akira Yoshikawa
Horizon in the Middle of Nowhere (2011), Captain
Maji de Watashi ni Koi Shinasai! (2011), Kazuko Kawakami
Diabolik Lovers (2013), Cordelia
In Search of the Lost Future (2014), Yui Furukawa
The Fruit of Grisaia (2014), Kazuki Kazami
Time Bokan 24: The Villains' Strike Back (2017), Yáng Yuhuan
Black Rock Shooter: Dawn Fall (2022), Lunatic

Video games
Tristia of the Deep-Blue Sea (2002), Rafarew
Snow Sakura (2003), Saki Tachibana
Remember 11: The Age of Infinity (2004), Suzukage Hotori
Underbar Summer (2005), Wakana Shimazu
Harukoi Otome (2006), Riru Orito
Seinarukana: The Spirit of Eternity Sword 2 (2007), Nagamine Nozomi (under the alias Yukari Aoyama)
Chaos;Head (2008), Orgel Seira
Hoshiuta (2008), Midori Kinoshita
We Without Wings (2009), Akira Yoshikawa
Maji de Watashi ni Koi Shinasai! (2009), Kazuko Kawakami
In Search of the Lost Future (2010), Yui Furukawa
Kamidori Alchemy Meister (2011), Black Eushully/Jane
Root Double: Before Crime * After Days (2012), Jun Moribe
Blue Archive (2022), Sorai Saki

Dubbing roles

Drama CD
Mashiroiro Symphony (2010), Eleanor Sewell

References

External links
Akane Tomonaga's personal blog 
Akane Tomonaga's profile at Axl One 

Living people
Japanese voice actresses
People from Tokyo
Year of birth missing (living people)